or  is a lake that lies in the municipality of Grane in Nordland county, Norway. The name of the lake translates as "fishless lake".

See also
 List of lakes in Norway
 Geography of Norway

References

Lakes of Nordland
Grane, Nordland